Stehlík (feminine Stehlíková) is a fairly common Czech and Slovak surname. It means European goldfinch. Notable people with the surname include:

 Džamila Stehlíková (born 1962), Kazakh-Czech politician
 Henrik Stehlik (born 1980), German athlete
 Jan Stehlík (basketball) (born 1986), Czech basketball player
 Jan Stehlík (handballer) (born 1985), Czech handball player
 Jan Stehlík (wrestler), Czech Olympic wrestler
 Josef Stehlík, Czech fighter pilot
 Petr Stehlík (born 1977), Czech shot putter
 Richard Stehlík (born 1984), Slovak ice hockey player

See also 
 

Czech-language surnames
Slovak-language surnames